Gun is an American television anthology series which followed a gun as it was passed from owner to owner. The show aired on ABC on Saturday night from April 12 to May 31, 1997. The series lasted six episodes, each directed by a well-known director, before being cancelled.

Summary
Each episode involves a pearl-handled .45 semi-automatic pistol as an important part of the plot. The characters in each episode are completely different and unrelated to those who appear in other episodes. The series was produced by Robert Altman and attracted numerous recognizable stars including Fred Ward, Kathy Baker, Carrie Fisher, Daryl Hannah, Randy Quaid, Martin Sheen and James Gandolfini in his first television role.

Episodes

See also
 Winchester '73

References

External links
 

1990s American anthology television series
American Broadcasting Company original programming
1990s American drama television series
1997 American television series debuts
1997 American television series endings
Television shows set in Detroit